Sinanköy can refer to:

 Sinanköy, Bismil
 Sinanköy, Elâzığ
 Sinanköy, Lalapaşa